Dave's Picks Volume 30 is a 3-CD live album by the rock band the Grateful Dead.  It contains the complete early and late shows recorded on January 2, 1970 at the Fillmore East in New York City, along with five songs from the band's performances at the same venue the following night.  It was released on May 3, 2019 in a limited edition of 20,000 copies.

Some copies of the album also include the Dave's Picks 2019 Bonus Disc.  The additional CD contains ten more songs from the January 3 concerts.

Dave's Picks Volume 30 includes psychedelic rock songs such as the ones on the band's then-recent albums Anthem of the Sun, Aoxomoxoa, and Live/Dead, as well as folk rock songs like the ones on their album Workingman's Dead, which would not be released until five months after these concerts.  The Dead's musical lineup included keyboardist Tom Constanten, who would leave the band about three weeks later.

Recording 
On Friday and Saturday night, January 2 and 3, 1970, the Grateful Dead played early and late shows at the Fillmore East in New York City.  Their performances were recorded by their audio engineer Owsley Stanley.  The concerts were promoted by Bill Graham.  Appearing on the same bill were the bands Lighthouse and Cold Blood.

Critical reception 
On AllMusic, Timothy Monger wrote, "Covering an interesting period of the Grateful Dead's history, Dave's Picks, Vol. 30 brings listeners to January 1970, when the band was transitioning out of the exploratory electric psych rock of the late '60s and into their more acoustic Americana period."

Track listing 
Disc 1
January 2, 1970 early show:
"Mason's Children" (Jerry Garcia, Bob Weir, Phil Lesh, Robert Hunter) – 6:12 
"Casey Jones" (Garcia, Hunter) – 4:28
"Black Peter" (Garcia, Hunter) – 12:21
"Mama Tried" (Merle Haggard) – 2:29
"Hard to Handle" (Otis Redding, Al Bell, Allen Jones) – 5:02
"Cumberland Blues" (Garcia, Lesh, Hunter) – 5:42
"That's It for the Other One" – 18:19
I. "Cryptical Envelopment" (Garcia)
II. "Drums" (Mickey Hart, Bill Kreutzmann)
III. "The Other One" (Weir, Kreutzmann)
IV. "Cryptical Envelopment" (Garcia)
"Cosmic Charlie" (Garcia, Hunter) – 7:06
January 2, 1970 late show:
"Uncle John's Band" (Garcia, Hunter) – 7:24
"High Time" (Gracia, Hunter) – 7:22

Disc 2
"Dire Wolf" (Garcia, Hunter) – 4:43
"Easy Wind" (Hunter) – 7:49
"China Cat Sunflower" (Garcia, Hunter) – 4:47
"I Know You Rider" (traditional, arranged by Grateful Dead) – 4:12
"Good Lovin'" (Rudy Clark, Artie Resnick) – 7:24
"Me and My Uncle" (John Phillips) – 4:33
"Monkey and the Engineer" (Jesse Fuller) – 1:54
January 3, 1970 bonus tracks:
"Morning Dew" (Bonnie Dobson, Tim Rose) – 10:00
"Big Boss Man" (Al Smith, Luther Dixon) – 4:24
"Dancing in the Street" (William "Mickey" Stevenson, Marvin Gaye, Ivy Jo Hunter) – 10:50
"St. Stephen" (Garcia, Lesh, Hunter) – 6:14
"In the Midnight Hour" (Steve Cropper, Wilson Pickett) – 9:31

Disc 3
January 2, 1970 late show, continued:
"Dark Star" (Garcia, Hart, Kreutzmann, Lesh, Ron "Pigpen" McKernan, Weir, Hunter) – 32:12 
"St. Stephen" (Garcia, Lesh, Hunter) – 9:16 
"The Eleven" (Lesh, Hunter) – 10:28
"Turn On Your Lovelight" (Joe Scott, Deadric Malone) – 22:50

Dave's Picks 2019 Bonus Disc
January 3, 1970 selections:
"Cold Rain and Snow" (traditional, arranged by Grateful Dead) – 6:07
"Alligator" > (Lesh, McKernan, Hunter) – 4:00
"Drums" > (Hart, Kreutzmann) – 1:59
"Alligator" > (Lesh, McKernan, Hunter) – 12:07
"Feedback" (Grateful Dead) – 6:37
"Casey Jones" (Garcia, Hunter) – 4:59
"Mason's Children" (Garcia, Weir, Lesh, Hunter) – 5:39
"That's It for the Other One" – 21:57
I. "Cryptical Envelopment" (Garcia)
II. "Drums" (Hart, Kreutzmann)
III. "The Other One" (Weir, Kreutzmann)
IV. "Cryptical Envelopment" (Garcia)
"Cosmic Charlie" (Garcia, Hunter) – 7:46
"Uncle John's Band " (Garcia, Hunter) – 6:58

Notes

Concert set lists 
The set lists for the concerts were:

January 2, 1970:

Early show: "Mason's Children", "Casey Jones", "Black Peter", "Mama Tried", "Hard to Handle", "Cumberland Blues", "Cryptical Envelopment", "Drums", "The Other One", "Cryptical Envelopment", "Cosmic Charlie"

Late show: "Uncle John's Band", "High Time", "Dire Wolf", "Easy Wind", "China Cat Sunflower", "I Know You Rider", "Good Lovin'", "Me and My Uncle", "Monkey and the Engineer", "Dark Star", "St. Stephen", "The Eleven", "Turn On Your Lovelight"

January 3, 1970:

Early show: "Morning Dew", "Me and My Uncle", "Hard to Handle", "Cumberland Blues", Cold Rain and Snow", "Alligator", "Drums", "Alligator", "Feedback" Encore: "Uncle John's Band"

Late show: "Casey Jones", "Mama Tried", "Big Boss Man", "China Cat Sunflower", "I Know You Rider", "Mason's Children", "Cryptical Envelopment", "Drums", "The Other One", "Cryptical Envelopment", "Cosmic Charlie", "Uncle John's Band", "Black Peter", "Dire Wolf", "Good Lovin'", "Dancing in the Street" Encore: "St. Stephen", "In the Midnight Hour"

 On disc 2
 On bonus disc
 Not included

Personnel 
Grateful Dead
Jerry Garcia – guitar, vocals
Bob Weir – guitar, vocals
Phil Lesh – bass, vocals
Ron "Pigpen" McKernan – harmonica, percussion, vocals
Tom Constanten – keyboards
Bill Kreutzmann – drums
Mickey Hart – drums
Production
Produced by Grateful Dead
Produced for release by David Lemieux
Associate Producers: Ivette Ramos & Doran Tyson
Recording: Owsley Stanley
Mastering: Jeffrey Norman
Art direction, design: Steve Vance
Cover art: Tyler Crook
Photos: Amalie R. Rothschild
Liner notes: Strider Brown, Jeffrey Taylor, Starfinder Stanley, Hawk

Charts

References 

30
Rhino Records live albums
2019 live albums